Rhyticeros is a genus of medium to large hornbills (family Bucerotidae) found in forests from Southeast Asia to the Solomons. They are sometimes included in the genus Aceros. On the other hand, most species generally placed in Aceros are sometimes moved to Rhyticeros, leaving Aceros as a monotypic genus only containing the rufous-necked hornbill.

All species generally placed in Rhyticeros have relatively low, conspicuously wreathed casques and a mainly dull whitish horn-colored bill. Both sexes have mainly black plumage, but the head and neck of the males are white or rufous. The tail is white except in the black-tailed Sumba hornbill. They have conspicuous inflatable skin on the throat, which is blue in all except the males of the plain-pouched and wreathed hornbills, where it is yellow.

Species
As generally recognized, the following species belong in the genus Rhyticeros:

An undescribed extinct hornbill species from Lifou in the Loyalty Islands, living until at least some 30,000 years ago, was initially placed in Aceros, but its biogeography places it with the species now in Rhyticeros (Steadman, 2006).

References
 Kemp, A. C. (2001). Family Bucerotidae (Hornbills). pp. 436–523 in: del Hoyo, J., Elliott, A., & Sargatal, J. eds. (2001). Handbook of the Birds of the World. Vol. 6. Mousebirds to Hornbills. Lynx Edicions, Barcelona. 
 Steadman, David William (2006): Extinction and Biogeography of Tropical Pacific Birds. University of Chicago Press. 

 
Bird genera
 
Taxa named by Ludwig Reichenbach